There several plattforms for software agents or also agent development toolkits, which can facilitate the development of multi-agent systems. Hereby, software agents are implemented as independent threads which communicate with each other using agent communication languages. Below is a chart intended to capture many of the features that are important to such plattforms.

Comparison of plattforms

References

Software comparisons